Trachylepis pendeana is a species of skink found in Central African Republic.

References

Endemic fauna of the Central African Republic
Trachylepis
Reptiles described in 2000
Taxa named by Laurent Chirio
Taxa named by Ivan Ineich